Darko Kovačević (born 18 November 1973) is a Serbian former professional footballer who played as a forward. He began his career in Serbia with Proleter Zrenjanin and subsequently played for Red Star Belgrade, with whom he won a Yugoslav League title and two Yugoslav Cups. His prolific performances earned him a move to Premier League side Sheffield Wednesday, although his time in England was less successful. He is mainly known for his spells at Real Sociedad where his offensive partnership with Nihat Kahveci was one of the best in Spain. Kovačević also had positive spells with Italian club Juventus and Greek side Olympiacos. Internationally, he represented Yugoslavia at the 1998 FIFA World Cup and at the UEFA Euro 2000.

Club career

Proleter and Red Star Belgrade
Beginning his career with his hometown club FK Radnički Kovin, he was soon spotted by Zrenjanin-based top league club FK Proleter Zrenjanin. Spending two seasons with the club, Kovačević managed over a goal every other game, was signed by Serbian giants Red Star Belgrade. Kovačević won a Yugoslav League title and two Yugoslav Cups, earning a call-up to the Yugoslavia national team.

Sheffield Wednesday
Kovačević was then signed by Premier League club Sheffield Wednesday in December 1995 valued at £2.5m in a joint £4.5m transfer also involving Dejan Stefanovic. Darko's notable goals for The Owls were two against Bolton Wanderers at Hillsborough and an important finish versus Liverpool, also at home.

Darko played the remainder of the 1995/96 season but his failure to adapt and settle into the UK way of life prompted a bid of £2.5m from Real Sociedad to be accepted. A % sell-on clause in the transfer agreement ensured Sheffield Wednesday received a further £2.0m (taking the transfer to £4.5m) when Real Sociedad later sold him to Juventus.

Real Sociedad
Kovačević moved to La Liga side Real Sociedad in 1996. Larger clubs soon came calling, with Italian giants Juventus acquiring the big Serbian in the summer of 1999 for 33 billion lire (£12 million).

Juventus and Lazio

At Juventus, Kovačević found goals in both the Serie A and competitions such as the UEFA Champions League and UEFA Cup becoming their leading European goal scorer, and the top-scorer of the UEFA Cup during the 1999–2000 season, with 10 goals; despite facing competition from the club's starting attacking partnership of Filippo Inzaghi and Alessandro Del Piero, Kovačević made a total of 44 appearances in all competitions in his first season with the club (27 in Serie A, 3 in the Coppa Italia, and 11 in European competitions), scoring 21 goals in all competitions (eight in Serie A, two in the Coppa Italia, and 11 in European competitions, one of which came in Juventus's victorious UEFA Intertoto Cup campaign, which enabled them to qualify for the UEFA Cup).

The following season, due to the arrival of French striker David Trezeguet, Kovačević found less space in the squad under manager Carlo Ancelotti, making 27 appearances in all competitions (20 of which came in Serie A), mostly from the bench, and scoring only six goals (five in Serie A). The Juventus management felt Kovačević was underachieving and soon both parties were looking for a move out of Italy, with clubs such as Rangers willing to offer £12m for his transfer. In 2001 Kovačević spent a brief time with Lazio (as part-swap deal with Marcelo Salas), making only seven appearances, before moving back to Spain in the middle of the season.

Return to Real Sociedad
In 2001 Kovačević returned to Real Sociedad, where he spent 6 more seasons at the club, netting 51 goals in his second spell with Sociedad. The 2006–07 season would be Kovačević's last season with the Spanish side, ending in the club's relegation. Alongside Jesús María Satrústegui, Kovačević is Real Sociedad's all-time top goalscorer in European club competitions, with 10 goals.
Darko Kovacevic scored 107 goals in his stages with Real Sociedad in 9 seasons, with a total average of between 11 and 12 goals per season. They are only surpassed by Jesús María Satrústegui and López Ufarte in the txuri-urdin team. He is until today, the most efficient foreigner that Real Sociedad has had in all its years of existence.

Olympiacos
In 2007 Kovačević signed with Greek champions Olympiacos. In early 2009, he was diagnosed with a blocked artery; he successfully underwent heart surgery to improve the flow of blood to his heart. His doctors advised to retire from football, and Kovačević officially retired in May 2009, playing a final friendly match for Olympiakos to celebrate the winning of the Greek domestic double. With Olympiacos, Kovačević won two Greek SuperLeague titles, two Greek Cups and a Greek Super Cup.

International career
Kovačević made 59 appearances for the then Serbia and Montenegro. Beginning his international career in 1994, Kovačević would go on to score 10 goals and compete in both UEFA Euro 2000 and the 1998 FIFA World Cup.

Style of play
A quick and powerful striker, with good movement, technique, and an eye for goal, Kovačević's key attributes were his strength and aerial ability.

After retirement
After his retirement Kovačević stated that he may take another role for his former team Olympiacos. Kovačević and family subsequently returned to Spain. However, Kovačević returned to Greece as he loved the country and worked for several months as a columnist. In June 2010 the new president of Olympiakos, Evangelos Marinakis, hired Kovacevic as a Chief Scout for the club; he eventually become the sports director for the club. He remained in that position until 2018. He is the current sports director of the Serbian Football Association.

Personal life
Kovačević has three children, Mia, Darko (Jr.) and Stella.

Career statistics

Club

International
Includes caps for FR Yugoslavia (1994–2002) and Serbia and Montenegro (2003–2004)

Scores and results list FR Yugoslavia/Serbia and Montenegro's goal tally first, score column indicates score after each Kovačević goal.

Honours

Red Star Belgrade
 Yugoslav League: 1994–95
 Yugoslav Cup: 1994–95, 1995–96

Juventus
 UEFA Intertoto Cup: 1999

Olympiakos
 Greek Super League: 2007–08, 2008–09
 Greek Cup: 2007–08, 2008–09
 Greek Super Cup: 2007

Individual
 UEFA Cup Top Goal Scorer: 1998–99 (8 goals), 1999–2000 (10 goals)
 Super League Greece Best Foreign Player: 2007–08

Notes

References

External links

 
 
 
 
 

1973 births
Living people
People from Kovin
Serbian footballers
Serbian expatriate footballers
Red Star Belgrade footballers
Sheffield Wednesday F.C. players
La Liga players
Real Sociedad footballers
Juventus F.C. players
S.S. Lazio players
Serie A players
Expatriate footballers in Spain
Expatriate footballers in England
Expatriate footballers in Italy
Expatriate footballers in Greece
FK Proleter Zrenjanin players
Olympiacos F.C. players
Super League Greece players
1998 FIFA World Cup players
UEFA Euro 2000 players
Premier League players
Serbia and Montenegro international footballers
Serbia and Montenegro expatriate footballers
Serbia and Montenegro footballers
Serbia and Montenegro expatriate sportspeople in Spain
Serbia and Montenegro expatriate sportspeople in England
Serbia and Montenegro expatriate sportspeople in Italy
Serbian expatriate sportspeople in Spain
Serbian expatriate sportspeople in Greece
People named in the Panama Papers
Association football forwards